The 1988 AAA Championships was an outdoor track and field competition organised by the Amateur Athletic Association (AAA), held from 5–7 August at Alexander Stadium in Birmingham, England.It served as the trials for the 1988 British Olympic team. It was considered the de facto national championships for the United Kingdom, ahead of the 1989 UK Athletics Championships.

For the first time, men's and women's events were contested at the same championships, with the WAAA Championships merging with the previously men-only AAA Championships.

The men's decathlon, women's heptathlon and women's 5000 metres events were hosted in Stoke-on-Trent. The women's 10,000 m walk was held in London.

Medal summary

Men

Women

References

AAA Championships
AAA Championships
Athletics Outdoor
AAA Championships
Sports competitions in Birmingham, West Midlands
Athletics competitions in England